Mwanga may refer to:

 Mwanga I of Buganda
 Mwanga II of Buganda, the last monarch of an independent Buganda
 Danny Mwanga, a Major League Soccer striker
 Mwanga District, a district of the Kilimanjaro Region of Tanzania
 Mwanga, Tanzania, a town of the Mwanga District in Tanzania
 Mwanga (Tanzanian ward), a ward in the Mkalama District in Tanzania
 Mwanga people, of Zambia and Tanzania
 Mwanga language